Rienk Jelgerhuis (13 April 1729 – 17 April 1806) was a Dutch painter, engraver and draftsman.

Jelgerhuis was born in Leeuwarden.  He mainly made his fame as a travelling portrait-painter and has no fewer than 7,763 portraits standing to his credit. He taught his son, Johannes Jelgerhuis, who became an accomplished painter, illustrator and actor.  Rienk Jelgerhuis died in Amsterdam.

References

External links 

Rijksbureau voor Kunsthistorische Documentatie
Union List of Artist Names

1729 births
1806 deaths
18th-century Dutch painters
18th-century Dutch male artists
Dutch male painters
People from Leeuwarden
18th-century Dutch people